William Herman Lee (August 29, 1931March 6, 1991) was an American professional football player who was an offensive tackle in the National Football League (NFL). He played 10 seasons with the Pittsburgh Steelers (1957) and the Chicago Bears (1958–1966).

References

External links
1954 NFL Draft from databasefootball.com

1931 births
1991 deaths
People from Phenix City, Alabama
Players of American football from Columbus, Georgia
American football offensive tackles
Florida A&M Rattlers football players
Pittsburgh Steelers players
Chicago Bears players